Pouilley-les-Vignes is a commune in the Doubs department in the Bourgogne-Franche-Comté region in eastern France.

Geography 
Fortifications were built on the surrounding heights by Jean de Chalon, Count of Burgundy in the 10th century. The only remains are the Porte d'Orange, a gate carved from the rock, and the Baraque des Enragés, a subterranean entrance to the fort.

Population

Economy 
Until 1920, wines such as Pulsard, Pinot, and Gamay were made in the commune, but very few small vineyards remain.

See also 
 Communes of the Doubs department

References

External links 

 Pouilley-les-Vignes on the intercommunal Web site of the department 

Communes of Doubs